Gifford State Forest may refer to:
 Gifford State Forest (Iowa)
 Gifford State Forest (Ohio)